Roff may refer to:

Computing
roff (software), early text formatter

Places in the United States
Roff, Kentucky
Roff, Oklahoma

People with the surname Roff
Derek Roff, Canadian biologist
Don Roff (born 1966), American writer and filmmaker
Jeremy Roff (born 1983), Australian middle-distance runner
Joe Roff (born 1975), Australian rugby union player
Rosie Roff (born 1989), British ring girl and model

See also
Roffe (disambiguation)
ROF (disambiguation)
Ruff (disambiguation)